The 2007–08 Meistriliiga season was the 18th season of the Meistriliiga, the top level of ice hockey in Estonia. Six teams participated in the league, and Tartu Välk 494 won the championship.

Standings

External links
Season on hockeyarchives.info

Meistriliiga
Meistriliiga
Meistriliiga (ice hockey) seasons